A marquess, Dutch: markies, is a nobleman of high hereditary rank in various European peerages and in those of some of their former colonies. The German language equivalent is Markgraf (margrave). A woman with the rank of a marquess or the wife (or widow) of a marquess is a marchioness or marquise. These titles are also used to translate equivalent Asian styles, as in Imperial China and Imperial Japan.

Etymology

The word marquess entered the English language from the Old French  ("ruler of a border area") in the late 13th or early 14th century. The distinction between governors of frontier territories and interior territories was made as early as the founding of the Roman Empire when some provinces were set aside for administration by the senate and more unpacified or vulnerable provinces were administered by the emperor.

Belgium
The title of marquess in Belgium predates the French Revolution and still exists today.

Spain
In Spain, the rank of Marquess/Marchioness (/) still exists. One hundred forty-two of them are Spanish grandees. Examples include the Marquess of Carpio, Grandee of Spain.

United Kingdom

In Great Britain and historically in Ireland, a marquess ranks below a duke and above an earl. A woman with the rank of a marquess, or the wife of a marquess, is a marchioness . The dignity, rank, or position of the title is a marquisate or marquessate.

The honorific prefix "The Most Honourable" precedes the name of a marquess or marchioness of the United Kingdom.

In Great Britain, and historically in Ireland, the spelling of this title is marquess. In Scotland, the French spelling marquis is sometimes used. 

The theoretical distinction between a marquess and other titles has, since the Middle Ages, faded into obscurity. In times past, the distinction between a count and a marquess was that the land of a marquess, called a march, was on the border of the country, while a count's land, called a county, often was not. As a result of this, a marquess was trusted to defend and fortify against potentially hostile neighbours and was thus more important and ranked higher than a count. The title is ranked below that of a duke, which was often largely restricted to the royal family.

The rank of marquess was a relatively late introduction to the British peerage: no marcher lords had the rank of marquess, though some were earls. On the evening of the Coronation of Queen Victoria in 1838, the Prime Minister Lord Melbourne explained to her why (from her journals):
I spoke to [Lord Melbourne] about the numbers of Peers present at the Coronation, & he said it was quite unprecedented. I observed that there were very few Viscounts, to which he replied "There are very few Viscounts," that they were an old sort of title & not really English; that they came from Vice-Comites; that Dukes & Barons were the only real English titles; – that Marquises were likewise not English, & that people were mere made Marquises, when it was not wished that they should be made Dukes.

Equivalent non-Western titles

Like other major Western noble titles, marquess (or marquis) is sometimes used to translate certain titles from non-Western languages with their own traditions, even though they are, as a rule, historically unrelated and thus hard to compare. However, they are considered "equivalent" in relative rank.

This is the case with: 
 In ancient China, 侯 (hóu) was the second of five noble ranks 爵 (jué) created by King Wu of Zhou and is generally translated as marquess or marquis. In imperial China, 侯 (hóu) is generally, but not always, a middle-to-high ranking hereditary nobility title. Its exact rank varies greatly from dynasty to dynasty, and even within a dynasty. It is often created with different sub-ranks.
 In Meiji Japan, 侯爵 (kōshaku), a hereditary peerage (kazoku) rank, was introduced in 1884, granting a hereditary seat in the upper house of the imperial diet just as a British peerage did (until the House of Lords Act 1999), with the ranks usually rendered as baron, viscount, count, marquis and duke/prince.
 In Korea, the title of 현후 (縣侯; hyeonhu), the meaning of which is "marquess of district", existed for the hereditary nobility in the Goryeo dynasty. It was equivalent to the upper fifth rank of nine bureaucratic orders, and was in the third rank of six nobility orders. The title of Buwongun, could be received only Father in law of King or The Vassals who dedicate Notably to create New kingdom is also same as Marquess. In the Joseon dynasty, there was no title equivalent to marquess.
 In Maritime Southeast Asia, temenggong (or tumenggung) is a title used by Islamic dynasties such as Mataram Sultanate and Johor to designate a noble ruled over a frontier area or district, or to a chief of public security. Tumenggung ranks below Bendahara or vizier.
 In Vietnam, hầu was a senior title of hereditary nobility, equivalent to marquis, for male members of the imperial clan, ranking under hoàng đế (皇帝)(emperor), vương (王)(king/prince), quốc công (國公)(grand duke/duke of the nation), quận công (郡公)(provincial duke) and công (公)(duke, rather like a German Fürst), and above bá (伯)(count), tử (子)(viscount) and nam (男)(baron).

In fiction

Marquesses and marchionesses have occasionally appeared in works of fiction.

See also 

 Mark (county)
 Marquesses in the United Kingdom
 List of marquesses in the peerages of Britain and Ireland
 List of marquessates in the peerages of Britain and Ireland
 List of marquises in Norway
 List of marquises in Portugal
 Exarch

Notes

References

 The Chronological Peerage of England, hereditarytitles.com as of 2 March 2003; ; omits Normanby, misspells Hartington as Martington, places Marquess of Lorn and Kintyre in the peerage of England (Scotland is more probable).
 EtymologyOnLine
  — "and in 1694 was made marquess of Normanby"

External links

 
 
 
Noble titles
Peerage
Men's social titles

de:Markgraf